Stephen John Hawinkels (born 12 March 1982) is a South African banker and former first-class cricketer.

Hawinkels was born at Cape Town in March 1982. He later studied in England at University College at the University of Oxford. While studying at Oxford, he played first-class cricket, making his debut for Oxford University against Cambridge University in The University Match of 2001, with Hawinkels also featuring in its 2002, 2003 and 2004 fixtures. In addition to playing for Oxford University, he also made three first-class appearances for Oxford UCCE in 2002 and 2004. In seven first-class appearances, Hawinkels scored 322 runs at an average of 29.27 and with a high score of 78, his only first-class half century. With his right-arm medium pace bowling, he took 2 wickets.

After graduating from Oxford, he became a banker with Goldman Sachs. In 2017, he was promoted to become a managing director at the group.

Notes and references

External links

1982 births
Living people
People from Cape Town
Alumni of University College, Oxford
South African cricketers
Oxford University cricketers
Oxford MCCU cricketers
South African bankers
South African expatriates in the United States
Goldman Sachs people